The Villa San Michele was built about the end of the 19th century on the isle of Capri, Italy, by the Swedish physician and author Axel Munthe.

Description
The villa's gardens have panoramic views of the town of Capri and its harbour, the Sorrentine Peninsula, and Mount Vesuvius.

San Michele's gardens are adorned with many relics and works of art dating from ancient Egypt and other periods of classical antiquity. They now form part of the Grandi Giardini Italiani.

In his later years, Axel Munthe wrote his youthful memoir The Story of San Michele, which describes how he first visited the island and built the villa, decorated with the remains of palaces built by the Ancient Romans which he found on his land. This colourfully written book was first published in 1929 and became an immediate worldwide success, being translated into many languages. It has been reprinted many times since then.

Between 1919 and 1920, Munthe was an unwilling landlord to the outrageous socialite and muse Luisa Casati, who took possession of Villa San Michele. This was described by the Scottish author Compton Mackenzie in his diaries.

Gallery

References

Further reading

External links

Villa San Michele
 Photo Gallery by Leonardo Bellotti 

San Michele
Buildings and structures in Capri, Campania